Harrow London Borough Council in London, England is elected every four years. Since the last boundary changes in 2002, 63 councillors are elected from 21 wards.

Political control
The first election to the council was held in 1964, initially operating as a shadow authority before the new system came into full effect in 1965. Political control of the council since 1964 has been held by the following parties:

Leadership
The leaders of the council since 1965 have been:

Council elections
 1964 Harrow London Borough Council election
 1968 Harrow London Borough Council election
 1971 Harrow London Borough Council election
 1974 Harrow London Borough Council election
 1978 Harrow London Borough Council election (boundary changes increased the number of seats by seven)
 1982 Harrow London Borough Council election
 1986 Harrow London Borough Council election
 1990 Harrow London Borough Council election
 1994 Harrow London Borough Council election (boundary changes took place but the number of seats remained the same)
 1998 Harrow London Borough Council election
 2002 Harrow London Borough Council election (boundary changes took place but the number of seats remained the same) 
 2006 Harrow London Borough Council election
 2010 Harrow London Borough Council election
 2014 Harrow London Borough Council election
 2018 Harrow London Borough Council election
 2022 Harrow London Borough Council election

Borough result maps

By-election results

1964-1968
There were a total of 12 by-elections, including eight on 24 June 1964 caused by aldermanic elections.

1968-1971

1971-1974

1974-1978

1978-1982

1982-1986

1986-1990

1990-1994

The by-election was called following the resignation of Cllr. Richard J. Denney.

The by-election was called following the death of Cllr. Charles D. Green.

The by-election was called following the resignation of Cllr. Ronald P. Grant.

The by-election was called following the resignation of Cllr. Howard C. Cooper.

The by-election was called following the death of Cllr. Leslie Nixon.

1994-1998

The by-election was called following the resignation of Cllr. Derek R. Wiseman.

 
The by-election was called following the resignation of Cllr. Brian G. T. Williams.

The by-election was called following the resignation of Cllr. Norah B. Murphy.

The by-election was called following the resignation of Cllr. Gareth R. Thomas.

The by-election was called following the resignation of Cllr. Andrew D. Wiseman.

 

The by-election was called following the death of Cllr. Alan W. Hamlin.

The by-election was called following the resignation of Cllr. Tony J. McNulty.

1998-2002

The by-election was called following the death of Cllr. Robert H. Lawrence.

The by-election was called following the death of Cllr. Ann L. Swaine.

The by-election was called following the death of Cllr. Antony C. Cocksedge.

2002-2006
There were no by-elections.

2006-2010

The by-election was called following the death of Cllr. John B. Anderson.

The by-election was called following the death of Cllr. Janet R. Cowan.

The by-election was called following the death of Cllr. Dhirajlal Lavingia.

2010-2014

The by-election was called following the death of Cllr. John Cowan.

The by-election was called following the resignation of Cllr. Mark A. Versallion.

The by-election was called following the resignation of Cllr. Brian E. Gate.

The by-election was called following the resignation of Cllr. Ms. Ann Gate.

2014-2018

The by-election was caused by the death of Cllr Bob Currie

The by-election was caused by the death of Cllr Mitzi Green

References

 By-election results

External links
 Harrow Council